Rampatti is a village in Mandhubani District, Bihar, India. The hamlet has a central jail and a Jawahar Navodaya Vidyalaya.

Rampatti is part of the Rajnagar Vidhan Sabha constituency. The local language is Maithili.

References

Villages in Madhubani district